Countess Eleonore Louise Albertine von Schlieben-Sanditten (1720 - 15 February 1755) was a German noblewoman and a lady in waiting to Elisabeth Christine of Brunswick-Wolfenbüttel-Bevern, the wife of Frederick the Great.

Biography 
Eleonore was born in 1720 to George Christoph, Count of Schlieben, Lord of Sanditten and Eleonore Lucia von Ilten.

In 1742 she married Baron Dietrich Cesarion von Keyserling. In 1744 they had a daughter, Adelaide Friederike von Keyserling. Frederick II served as the godfather of their daughter. Eleonore was widowed shortly after the birth of her daughter. Frederick II allowed her to take up residence at Schönhausen Castle, where she was in charge of housekeeping and managing the daily routines of the estate. She would entertain the Prussian queen, Elisabeth Christine of Brunswick-Wolfenbüttel-Bevern, by playing music. She was painted by Antoine Pesne, the court painter of Prussia, while in service to the queen. The painting now hangs in Charlottenburg Palace.

Eleonore died on 15 February 1755 in Berlin.

References 

1720 births
1755 deaths
18th-century German women
German baronesses
German countesses
German ladies-in-waiting
Von Schlieben family